Jon Gjerde (February 25, 1953 – October 26, 2008) was an American historian and the Alexander F. and May T. Morrison Professor of American History and American Citizenship at the University of California, Berkeley, where he also served as dean of the Division of Social Sciences in the College of Letters and Science at the University of California, Berkeley.

Biography
Gjerde was born in Waterloo, Iowa, and grew up in Cedar Falls, Iowa, the youngest of three children in a family of Norwegian immigrants. His father, Waldemar Gjerde, was a professor of education at the University of Northern Iowa, but died when Jon Gjerde was young; his mother was a schoolteacher. Gjerde himself attended the University of Northern Iowa, and graduated in 1975 with a double major in history and philosophy and religion. He went on to graduate studies in history at the University of Minnesota, earning a master's degree in 1978 and a Ph.D. in 1982.

After teaching at the University of Minnesota, the University of Wisconsin and the California Institute of Technology, Gjerde joined the UC Berkeley faculty in 1985. He was tenured in 1989. Gjerde served as resident director of the Scandinavian Study Center in Lund, Sweden from 1991 to 1992. He served as  chair of the history department at UC Berkeley from 2001 to 2004, was named interim dean of social sciences in 2006 and was confirmed as dean in 2007.   Like his father, he died in his 50s of a heart attack; he died in Albany, California. The Jon and Ruth Gjerde Graduate Student Endowment was established to benefit the UC Berkeley History Department.

Gjerde's research concerned European immigration to the Midwestern United States and European immigrants in the midwest. Among other accolades, Gjerde won three Theodore Saloutos Memorial Book awards for his writings on immigration and agricultural history. He was most commonly associated with his two prizewinning books, From Peasants to Farmers: The Migration from Balestrand, Norway, to the Upper Middle West (1989) and The Minds of the West: Ethnocultural Evolution in the Rural Middle West, 1830–1917 (1997)

Selected works
. This is an edited volume of primary sources and excerpts from scholars.
. Reviewed in J. Historical Geography , American Historical Review , Economic History Review , J. Interdisciplinary History , International Migration Review , Continuity and Change , and J. American History .
. Reviewed in J. American History , American Historical Review , Western Historical Quarterly , International Migration Review , American Anthropologist , and Rural History .
.

References

External links
The Jon and Ruth Gjerde Graduate Student Endowment

1953 births
2008 deaths
University of Northern Iowa alumni
University of Minnesota College of Liberal Arts alumni
University of Minnesota faculty
University of Wisconsin–Madison faculty
California Institute of Technology faculty
University of California, Berkeley College of Letters and Science faculty
20th-century American historians
American male non-fiction writers
American people of Norwegian descent
People from Cedar Falls, Iowa
Immigration historians
Historians from Iowa
Historians from California
20th-century American male writers